Banning may refer to:

People
Banning (surname)
Banning Eyre, an American guitarist and writer
Banning Liebscher, an American youth pastor for Jesus Culture
Banning Lyon, a plaintiff in a 1990s medical fraud case against NME, now Tenet Health

U.S. Communities
Banning, California, named for Phineas Banning
Banning, Delaware, a defunct town
Banning, Georgia
Banning Corner, Indiana, a defunct town
Banning, Minnesota, a ghost town

Other places
Banning Dam in Thousand Oaks, California
Banning High School (disambiguation)
Banning House, a museum in Los Angeles, California
Banning Municipal Airport in Banning, California
Banning Pass, an alternate name for San Gorgonio Pass
Banning State Park in Minnesota

Other uses
Banning (film), released in 1967
Banning (internet), a technical measure that restricts access to information or resources
Banning orders, a measure used by the apartheid-era South African government to silence dissent
Shadow banning, a practice in which a user of some online community is made invisible to all other users

See also
Ban (disambiguation)
Banningham
Censorship